XHJPA-FM is a Regional Mexican radio station serving Jojutla and Cuernavaca, Morelos.

History

XHJPA began as XEDO-AM 1190 with a concession granted on October 6, 1965. The call sign was changed to XEJPA-AM in the late 1990s or early 2000s, at the same time the station began transmitting at night and increased its day power to 5 kW. Formats of the late 1990s and early 2000s included "La Grande 1190 AM", W Radio, and the short-lived Red W Interactiva.

XEJPA migrated to FM in 2011 and became XHJPA-FM, branding as "La Poderosa". The station became "La Mexicana" in 2013, when the Radiorama cluster in Cuernavaca split; it retained this name until November 2019, when it flipped to Spanish adult contemporary as "Stereo Vida".

References

External links
Stereo Vida 90.3 Facebook

1965 establishments in Mexico
Radio stations in Morelos